Triplophysa bellibarus is a species of stone loach in the genus Triplophysa.

Etymology
The fish's name is the latinization of the Anglo-Saxon belly and bar, referring to the six brownish transverse bars on the abdomen.

References

bellibarus
Freshwater fish of China
Endemic fauna of China
Taxa named by Tchang Tchung-Lin
Taxa named by Yueh Tso-Huo
Taxa named by Hwang Hwon-Chin
Fish described in 1963